Ardington and Lockinge are two civil parishes in the Vale of White Horse district, centred about  east of Wantage, Oxfordshire, that share a single parish council. The two parishes were part of Berkshire until 1974 when they were transferred to Oxfordshire.

Description and villages
The combined parish council was created in 2012 by merging the formerly separate parish councils of Ardington and Lockinge. Most land and property in the area is owned and managed by the Lockinge Estate. Ginge Brook and its tributary Goddard's Brook drain the parishes into the River Ock a few miles to the north. The Great Western Main Line between Didcot and Swindon passes through the parishes.

The two parishes include the following villages:
 Ardington
 Ardington Wick, a hamlet
 East Lockinge
 West Lockinge
 West Ginge
 Remnants of Betterton, a "lost" or depleted hamlet

References

Further reading

Vale of White Horse